The Santa Rosa Hills are a mountain range in the Saline Valley the northern Mojave Desert, in Inyo County, California.

They are between the Inyo Mountains and the Nelson Range, west of Death Valley and in Death Valley National Park.

See also
Lost Burro Formation

References 

Mountain ranges of Inyo County, California
Mountain ranges of the Mojave Desert
Death Valley National Park
Hills of California